Joey Lawrence (born 1976) is an American actor and singer.

Joey Lawrence may also refer to:

 Joey Lawrence (album), a self-titled 1993 album by Joey Lawrence
 Joey Lawrence (photographer) (born 1989), Canadian photographer
 Joseph Lawrence (Pennsylvania politician) (1786–1842), member of the U.S. House of Representatives from Pennsylvania

See also
 Joseph Lawrence (disambiguation)

Lawrence, Joey